Guru Bhakt Singh 'Bhakt' (गुरु भक्त सिंह 'भक्त', 7 August 1893 – 17 May 1983) was a renowned poet and dramatist from northern India.

Life
Guru Bhakt Singh was born in Zamania, in a civil servant family. His father, Shri Kalika Prasad Singh, a government doctor and held the charge of the Government hospital, Zamania-Ghazipur. After completing his primary education in Ballia and Gorakhpur, he came to Allahabad. Here he completed his B.A. and L.L.B.. After working as an advocate for some time, he switched to a government job. In Allahabad, he came in contact with many famous poets and writers.

He was one of the knot of scholars of the Muir Central College, Allahabad which included luminaries like Dr. Amar Nath Jha.

He had two marriages. He was married to Van Shree Devi of Ballia while he was studying in intermediate. Vanshree Devi gave birth to a son named Guru Sharan Singh and died thereafter. Gurubhakt Singh loved his first wife Van Shree Devi so much that he immortalized her memory in the form of the great poem Van Shree Dhvani. Thereafter the great poet was married to his second wife Shashimukhi Devi of Ballia with whom he had four sons (Kunwar Singh, Kanahaiya Singh, Anand Singh & Arvind Singh) and four daughters (Nandini, Ratan, Chndrakala & Shakuntala). The only living son, Anand Singh, lives in Lucknow. Anand Singh was principal of Polytechnic and is a poet. He has two sons (Ashish and Vaibhav) and one daughter (Shweta).

Poetic themes
Guru Bhakt Singh dealt with different subjects and wrote on various aspects and objects of nature.

Details about his work
In the year 1925, when Saras Suman, the first poetic work of Shri Guru Bhakt Singh Bhakta, was published through the efforts of Nagari Pracharini Sabha Ballia, its brilliance dazzled the Hindi world and overnight he was declared a poet. Pt. Ajodhya Singh Upadhya Hariaudh declared him the founder of the Nature school in Hindi and the eminent scholar Dr. Amar Nath Jha saw in him the genius of Wordsworth, sweetness of Hafiz and vividness of Goldsmith.

A collection of his poems, mostly on nature, was published later as Kusum Kunj and Bansi Dhwani.

In 1935, the dramatic poetry work Nur Jahan was published to wide acclaim. It was later translated into English.

Thakur Guru Bhakta Singh has won for himself a unique position. Dr. Amarnath Jha, late Vice Chancellor of Allahabad University, called him "The Wordsworth of Hindi Poetry".

In 1948 his second Mahakavya, Vikramaditya, appeared --- a dramatic piece in verse which bears the imprint of scholarship and research and its inclusion in post-graduate study at different universities has put a seal to the hall mark of its excellence.

His son, Arvind Singh, later on took his father's work and wrote a book upon it. Due to his death on 30 May 2004, the book remains unpublished. Only 3 copies were ever made.

Awards and honours
Honoured with 'साहित्य- वारिधि' award in the Uttar Pradesh Hindi Sahitya Samelan.
Honoured by Morarji Desai (Former Prime Minister), in Aug 1977, for his exemplary services to Hindi literature.
He received "मंगला प्रसाद पारितोषिक" award for Nurjahan.
He was also awarded with रत्नाकर पदक, 
    बलदेव दास पदक, 
    मंगला प्रसाद पारितोषिक

Bibliography

Poetry
Saras Suman (1925)
Kusum Kunj (1927)
Vanshidwani (1932)
Nurjahan (1935)
Vikramaditya (1944)
Do Phool (1963)

Dramas
Prem-paash (1919) - Unpublished
Tasneem (1920) - Unpublished
Radhiya (1924) - Unpublished

1893 births
1983 deaths
People from Ghazipur
Hindi-language poets
University of Allahabad alumni
20th-century Indian poets
Indian male poets
Poets from Uttar Pradesh
20th-century Indian male writers